
Year 918 (CMXVIII) was a common year starting on Thursday (link will display the full calendar) of the Julian calendar.

Events 
 By place 

 Europe 
 December 23 – King Conrad I, injured at one of his battles with Arnulf I (the Bad), dies at his residence in Weilburg Castle after a 7-year reign. On his deathbed Conrad persuades his younger brother Eberhard III to offer the East Frankish crown to Henry the Fowler, the duke of Saxony. Conrad is buried in Fulda Cathedral (also the burial place of Boniface) in Germany.

 Britain 
 Battle of Corbridge: High-Reeve Ealdred I persuades King Constantine II of Scotland to help him reclaim his position in Bernicia. They mount an invasion of his now Norse controlled lands. The Vikings under Ragnall ua Ímair (or Rægnald) defeat the Scots and their allies at Corbridge (Northern Northumbria), but take heavy casualties themselves. 
 Summer – Lady Æthelflæd of Mercia begins to intrigue with disaffected factions within the Norse Kingdom of York (also referred to as Jórvik). Mercian troops ravage the local countryside and peacefully overrun the fortress of Leicester (belonging to the Five Boroughs of the Danelaw), while her brother, King Edward the Elder, takes Stamford.
 June 12 – Æthelflæd dies at Tamworth while campaigning against the Vikings. She is buried with her husband Æthelred in St. Oswald's Priory at Gloucester. Æthelflæd is succeeded by her only daughter Ælfwynn. 
 Kings Idwal Foel of Gwynedd and Hywel ap Cadell, and Prince Clydog of Deheubarth (Wales) submit to the overlordship of Edward the Elder. The Vikings raid Anglesey.

 Asia 
 July 25 – Wang Kon, a Korean general, overthrows the government of the short-lived state Ho Goguryeo and ascends the throne at Cheorwon. He founds the Goryeo Dynasty and makes Song'ak his capital.
 Emperor Taizu of the Khitan Empire occupies a newly walled city called Shangjing (modern-day Inner Mongolia), meaning Supreme Capital. It becomes the residence of the Chinese Liao Dynasty.

Births 
 Minamoto no Hiromasa, Japanese nobleman (d. 980)

Deaths 
 January 21 – Liu Zhijun, Chinese general
 June 12 – Æthelflæd, lady of Mercia (b. c.870)
 July 6 – William I, duke of Aquitaine (b. 875)
 September 10 – Baldwin II, Frankish margrave
 October 1 – Zhou, empress of Former Shu
 December 23 – Conrad I, Frankish king
 Gung Ye, king of Hu Goguryeo (Korea)
 Husayn ibn Hamdan, Abbasid general
 Lady Ren Neiming, Chinese noblewoman  (b. 865)
 Miyoshi Kiyotsura, Japanese scholar (b. 847)
 Ottir (the Black), Norse Viking chieftain
 Tan Quanbo, Chinese warlord (approximate date)
 Wang Jian, emperor of Former Shu (b. 847)
 Xu Zhixun, Chinese governor and regent
 Zhu Jin, Chinese warlord (b. 867)

References